American dogwood may refer to:

 Cornus florida, a deciduous tree also known as Flowering Dogwood
 Cornus sericea, a deciduous shrub